Chase Allen (born August 29, 1993) is an American football linebacker who is currently a free agent. He played college football at Southern Illinois University.

High school
Attended Belleville East High School in Belleville, Illinois. Allen was a First-team All-Conference selection and committed to Southern Illinois University in 2012.

College career
Allen played in 35 games for the Salukis, he played at outside and middle linebacker and was a Second-team All-MVFC selection. He was the captain of the Salukis and known as the "Man in the Middle" as he had the heaviest bench press in the history of Salukis football.

Professional career
Allen signed with the Miami Dolphins as an undrafted free agent on May 5, 2017. He played in all 16 games as a rookie, starting 10, finishing with 40 tackles.

On October 17, 2018, Allen was placed on injured reserve with a foot injury.

On August 27, 2019, Allen was waived/injured by the Dolphins and placed on injured reserve.

References

External links
Southern Illinois Salukis bio

1993 births
Living people
Players of American football from Illinois
Southern Illinois Salukis football players
Sportspeople from Belleville, Illinois
Miami Dolphins players